Abbott is an unincorporated community in Scott County, Arkansas, United States.

History
Abbott was founded in 1899, and named after the local Abbott family.

Sources

Unincorporated communities in Scott County, Arkansas
Unincorporated communities in Arkansas